General elections were held in Alderney on 27 November 2010 in accordance with the rules governing elections in Alderney. Five of the ten seats in the States were up for election. There were 12 candidates.

Roy Burke, Chief Executive of the States of Alderney said "It has been most exciting, to see democracy in action was remarkable. I have a great team working around me who have organised everything very professionally which meant that all went very smoothly".

Results

2013 by-election
A  by-election was held on 11 May 2013 to replace Tony Llewellyn, who had resigned in March 2013. Six candidates stood for election, which was won by Steve Roberts.

See also
States of Alderney Member

References

Elections in Alderney
Alderney
2010 in Guernsey
November 2010 events in Europe